Joe MacLeod (born January 29, 1980) is a Canadian actor and television host.

Early life and education
Born in Cape Breton, Nova Scotia, Canada, Joe MacLeod studied acting in Calgary, Alberta, at Mount Royal College.

Career 
In 2001, he began his film and television career with a small role in Steven Spielberg's Taken. He also appeared in the MTV scripted drama Kaya, the movie Monster Island, and the series Ghost Trackers.

Filmography

Film

Television

External links

 Joe MacLeods Official Site
Ghost Trackers Official Site

1980 births
Living people
Canadian television hosts
Canadian male television actors
Canadian people of Scottish descent
People from Cape Breton Island
Male actors from Nova Scotia